Gibbomodiola is a genus of bivalves belonging to the family Mytilidae.

The species of this genus are found in Europe, Southeastern Asia and Australia.

Species:

Gibbomodiola adriatica 
Gibbomodiola albicosta 
Gibbomodiola biradiata 
Gibbomodiola taurarcuata

References

Mytilidae
Bivalve genera